Foothills Academy is an independent public charter elementary/middle school, located in Scottsdale, Arizona.  It was among the "first wave" of charter schools in State, and prides itself not just on consistently strong test scores and athletic accomplishments, but also on its positive, family-like community. Serving Kindergarten through Eighth Grade, Foothills Academy class sizes are never more than 24. It is an active member of the Canyon Athletic Association, providing a range of sports opportunities for grades 5-8.

History
Foothills Academy was established in 1993 as a grades 6-12 college preparatory school, by Dr. Don Senneville, who . In 2009, the school was excited to announce the addition of Foothills Academy Elementary Preparatory in Cave Creek, to serve grades 1-5. in 2013, all-day kindergarten (tuition-free). The following year, Foothills Academy Connected received approval by the Arizona State Board for Charter Schools under the Arizona Online Instruction Program as a full-time virtual school for grades 7-12. In 2017, Honey Bee Academy Preschool began serving youth ages 3-5 by leasing space on the Ashler Hills campus.    

Foothills Academy transitioned to a K-8 school, beginning in the 2019-20 school year with enrollment around 200. In addition to the administrative team, the FA family is led by 20 teachers and aids. The school features an individualized approach with multiage integrated classes and an innovative STEAM (Science, Technology, Engineering, Art, and Math) program for all grade levels.

See also 
 List of high schools in Arizona

External links 
 Foothills Academy website
Education in Scottsdale, Arizona
Educational institutions established in 1993
Schools in Maricopa County, Arizona
Charter schools in Arizona
1993 establishments in Arizona